Qarah Bashlu (also Romanized as Qarah Bāshlū and Qareh Bāshlū) is a village in Aladagh Rural District, in the Central District of Bojnord County, North Khorasan Province, Iran. In 2006, its population was 199, in 52 families.

References 

Populated places in Bojnord County